The Men's time trial of the 2022 UCI Road World Championships was a cycling event that took place on 18 September 2022 in Wollongong, Australia. It was the 29th edition of the championship, for which Filippo Ganna of Italy is the defending champion, having won in 2021.

Participating nations
50 cyclists from 31 nations competed in the event. The number of cyclists per nation is shown in parentheses.

Final classification

References

Men's time trial
UCI Road World Championships – Men's time trial
2022 in men's road cycling